Cloudland High School is a public high school in Roan Mountain, Tennessee, United States and is one of the Carter County schools in north east Tennessee. The school has 337 students in grades seven through twelve.

References

External links 
 

Schools in Carter County, Tennessee
Public high schools in Tennessee
Public middle schools in Tennessee
Roan Mountain, Tennessee